Eximacris is a genus of insects in the family Acrididae. It contains the following species:
 Eximacris superbum

References 

Acrididae genera
Taxonomy articles created by Polbot